Ile Soleil is a small artificial island (0.14 km²) in the Seychelles, lying 50m off the east coast of Mahé, near the runway of the Seychelles International Airport.

History
The island was reclaimed in 2008 after the Dubai Dredger finished its work in the Victoria Port islands. 
The local Anse-aux-Pins mayor decided he wanted an artificial island as well. 
There are plans to build a new terminal on the island, due to housing problems.

Administration
The island belongs to Anse-aux-Pins District.

Tourism
The future of the island is unclear, although it is proposed to have an oriental tourism industry.

Demography
The island's southern part is the location of a new luxurious neighborhood.

Transport
Soleil is linked to the mainland by a causeway.

Image gallery

References

External links 
 info
 Mahe Map 2015

Artificial islands of Seychelles
Islands of Mahé Islands